Henderson Motorsports is an American professional stock car racing team that currently competes in the NASCAR Craftsman Truck Series, fielding the No. 75 Chevrolet Silverado part-time for Parker Kligerman. The team previously competed in the Winston Cup Series, Busch Series, and Hooters Pro Cup Series.

History

Winston Cup Series

Car No. 26 history
The team fielded a part-time car from 1982 to 1984. They would make a combined 24 races with Teague, Ronnie Hopkins, and Morgan Shepherd. Their best finish would be 11th with Teague, and they would shift their sole focus to Busch series racing after the spring Martinsville race in 1984.

Drivers
Brad Teague (1982)

Ronnie Hopkins (1983)

Morgan Shepherd (1984)

Busch Series

Car No. 5 history
The No. 5 was used in the two 1995 and the first 1996 Bristol races by short track ringer and former full-time Henderson Motorsports driver Brad Teague. The 1995 races would see him run alongside the full-time No. 75, while the 1996 race would see him as the only Henderson Motorsports car to make the field. These races would see a best finish of 7th and a worst of 32nd, in the first and last races respectively.

Drivers
Brad Teague (1995-96)

Car No. 15 history
The No. 15 was first used for Henderson Motorsports' NASCAR debut, a one-race deal for Brad Teague. At the time he was also the driver for their Cup series team which would debut the following day. He finished 4th at the Busch series first trip to Bristol. The number would resurface fifteen years later for another one-race deal, as a second car alongside the main No. 75. With Brad Teague behind the wheel again for the first 1997 Bristol race, he would start and finish 22nd.

Drivers
Brad Teague (1982, 1997)

Car No. 66 history
The first time Henderson Motorsports ran a second car was for the second Bristol race in 1988. The number chosen was 66, and it was run by series regular  Geoffrey Bodine. After qualifying 3rd, he would have engine issues on lap 159 and finish 25th. No. 66 never appeared again for Henderson, nor did Geoffrey Bodine. Rusty Wallace was supposed to drive the #66 car for this race, but was involved in a crash in Cup practice, and was not able to drive, so the team chose Bodine as a last minute fill-in.

Drivers
Geoffrey Bodine (1988)

Car No. 75 history
Brad Teague drove the No. 75 Food Country USA Pontiac from 1985 to 1988 in the Busch Grand National Series, picking up one win and two poles, with a best finish of seventh in the final point standings. Rick Wilson drove for the team in 1989, netting two wins and one pole. 1990-91 would see them run part-time with a variety of drivers. These would include returnee Brad Teague, Cup drivers Ernie Irvan and Jimmy Spencer, prospects Ward Burton and Elton Sawyer, journeyman Curtis Markham, and the next full-time Henderson driver in Butch Miller. The best finish from these years was a second from Irvan at IRP in 1990 and a third from Miller at Rougemont in 1991. The 1992 season would be a return to form, as Butch Miller grabbed one pole, four top 5's, and ten top 10's, including a second at the final race of the season, to finish 7th in the point standings. This tied the best points finish of 7th set by Brad Teague in the team's formative years. 1993 would be a return to being tumultuous. After ten races, Butch Miller was released in favor of Rick Wilson returning. Miller had been 11th in points, with a pole, two top 5's, and four top 10's at the time of his dismissal. Wilson would share his seat every so often with one-off drivers, the best of these being a 4th place effort by Jimmy Hensley.

1994 would see an all-new driver champion the No. 75 car, Doug Heveron. A Whelen Modified regular, the initial year of this experiment would be a mixed bag. He had two top 5 finishes, but had little to no success elsewhere and failed to qualify in three events. He would finish a dismal 27th in points. 1995 would see a paring back from nearly full to part-time racing. The team would re-enlist Rick Wilson for a third time, but by then the magic was lost in the pairing and he would only have two top 10's to match his amount of DNQs. 1996 would see a return from Heveron, and the team would attempt to run the full schedule. After one top 10 to match 2 DNQ's a little over halfway in the season, however, the team would move to part-time. They would fail to qualify three of the four races attempted after this point. 1997-2001 would see them enter and make fewer and fewer races as the years passed. The No. 75 would be primarily piloted by Wilson and newcomer Kelly Denton. The best finish for the team during this timeframe would be a 5th at the second 1997 Bristol race, by Rick Wilson. This would turn out to be the final top 5 for the No. 75.

2002-03 would be a last hurrah for the No. 75 team. The team would sign Butch Miller on for an extended part-time schedule, the first time Miller had driven for the No. 75 since the 1993 season. The team would make all but one of their scheduled races, with a best finish of 15th at the first Bristol race. 2003 would see the team hiring Jay Sauter and increasing their schedule for the final time. Again only failing to make one race, this time the Daytona opener, the team would go from seven to ten made races. Sauter would be up and down throughout the year but would record the team's final top 10 with a 9th at Nashville. 2004 would limit Sauter and the No. 75 to six made races out of seven attempts and their last top 15 at Richmond. The next three years would see them make only one race a year, and a crash at the first Bristol race of 2007 would mark the end of the No. 75 in the Busch series. Brad Teague, the team's first-ever driver in 1982 with the No. 15 and for the No. 75 in 1985, would end up competing in its last race as well while driving for Jimmy Means Racing.

Drivers
Brad Teague (1985-88, 1990, 1996, 2001)

Rick Wilson (1989, 1993, 1995, 1997)

Butch Miller (1989, 1991-93, 2002)

Ernie Irvan (1990)

Jimmy Spencer (1990)

Ward Burton (1991)

Elton Sawyer (1991)

Curtis Markham (1991)

Scott Lagasse (1993)

Glenn Jarrett (1993)

Jimmy Hensley (1993)

Jim Bown (1993)

Doug Heveron (1994, 1996)

Johnny Rumley (DNQ'd 2 races in 1996)

Kelly Denton (1998-2000)

Scott Hansen (2001)

Randy Ratliff (DNQ'd 2 attempts in 2001)

Lance Hooper (DNQ'd 1 attempt in 2001)

Jay Sauter (2003-05)

Caleb Holman (2006-07)

Car No. 77 history
The second 1992 Bristol race would see the introduction of the No. 77. It was run by Rick Wilson, a former full-time driver in the No. 75. He would race with and beat the main No. 75, piloted then by Butch Miller, finishing 6th to his 10th. The number would return almost four years later to the day to be run by Brad Teague. Unlike four years prior, this entry would be the only Henderson entry in the race, as the No. 75 had failed to qualify. After starting on the front row, he would finish 19th.

Drivers
Rick Wilson (1992)

Brad Teague (1996)

Truck Series

Truck No. 75 history

After not attempting any NASCAR races for five years, the team entered the NASCAR Camping World Truck Series in 2012, fielding the No. 75 truck for Caleb Holman. Holman won the pole position for the Eldora race in 2016. During these five seasons, the team would make 32 races and accumulate two top 10's in the latter half. All of these races were run by Holman, who would be a consistent finisher during his tenure as the sole driver.

In 2017, the No. 75 attempted 10 races in the Truck Series. Parker Kligerman attempted eight races while Holman attempted two races. Kligerman got the team's first victory at Talladega Superspeedway. After the Eldora race, Holman would retire from NASCAR racing to focus on becoming a leader at his church. His last start would see him qualify in the top 10 but finish 32nd after transmission issues took him out on lap 12.

In 2018, Henderson Motorsports and Kligerman planned to run 8-10 races in the 2018 season. They would end up on the lower end of that spectrum. The team did record their first non-restrictor-plate race top 5, a 4th at Bristol, but would also crash out of three races.

2019-20 would see Kligerman make eleven races, with another top 5 in the same position and at the same race as the first one, coming in 2020.

For 2021, it was announced that defending ARCA Menards Series East champion Sam Mayer would be joining the returning Kligerman in driving the No. 75 for the team. The first of Mayer's seven-race schedule with Henderson will come at the Daytona Road Course, the only race of his schedule announced so far. Kligerman's schedule has also yet to be announced except for the season-opener at Daytona. As of May 6th, 2021, Mayer has made one start and Kligerman three. While Mayer crashed out of his only start thus far, Kligerman has recorded two top 10's and three top 15's after failing to qualify at Daytona. He returned to make his fourth start at Darlington after the team skipped two races. At the United Rentals 176 at The Glen, sponsor Fast announced that if Kligerman finished top five in the race, they would sell their hoodies for $1 online. Kligerman was fifth when the race was shortened due to rain, so Fast did indeed sell their hoodies online for only $1. The next race Kligerman ran, the In It To Win It 200, he scored his only other top five of 2021 with a fifth-place finish.

Starting off 2022 in the NextEra Energy 250, Kligerman gave the race-winning push to Zane Smith and finished fifth. The team would race again at COTA finishing 19th and then 16th at Martinsville. They would show up the next two races after that being Bristol Dirt and Darlington, and they finished 4th and 6th. They would race next at Sonoma finishing 7th. Their 7th race of the season would be Nashville Superspeedway where they started 23rd and finished 20th. Then heading to Mid-Ohio where they would get their 2nd win with Parker Kilgerman and their 2nd win in the last decade beating out Zane Smith in the 38 truck. Their next two races would be 11th at Kansas and 3rd at Bristol.

Drivers
Caleb Holman (2012-2017)

Parker Kligerman (Attempted one race in 2016 but failed to qualify, 2017-2023)

Sam Mayer (2021)

References

External links
 

American auto racing teams
NASCAR teams